Luke Morgan (born 16 May 1992) is a Welsh rugby union player who plays for the Ospreys as a wing. Born in Bridgend, Wales, he was a Wales under-20 and Wales Sevens international.

Rugby career
Morgan made his debut for the Ospreys in 2011 having previously played for the Ospreys academy, Bridgend Ravens, Bridgend Athletic RFC, Llanelli RFC, Newport RFC and the Ospreys Development team, but switched to rugby sevens in 2012. In 2016 Morgan was selected as part of the Great Britain sevens team which travelled to Moscow to take part in the Rugby Europe Grand Prix Sevens, and was part of the royals team that won the Silver Plate. Morgan was later selected to represent Wales at the 2018 Rugby World Cup Sevens in San Francisco. While playing in the World Cup, Morgan was involved in an off-the-pitch incident with Samoan player, Gordon Langkilde, which resulted in Morgan receiving facial injuries whilst teammate Tom Williams suffered a broken nose and cheekbone. The Wales players were not sanctioned for the affray and Langkilde was banned from rugby for a year. After becoming Wales' all-time record try scorer at sevens level, Morgan switched back to 15-a-side rugby in 2018, rejoining the Ospreys. He made his Pro14 debut on 14 September 2018 against Munster.

In October 2018 Morgan was called up to the senior  squad by Warren Gatland. Morgan made his debut against Scotland, starting on the wing.

References

External links 
Ospreys Player Profile

1992 births
Living people
Ospreys (rugby union) players
Rugby union players from Bridgend
Welsh rugby union players
Rugby union wings
Wales international rugby union players